Matthew Gray was the Deputy Governor of Bombay from 14 July 1669 to 7 June 1672.

References

Governors of Bombay
17th-century diplomats
Year of death unknown

Year of birth unknown